Bunk Bed is a comedy radio programme on BBC Radio 4 hosted by Peter Curran and Patrick Marber. The programme features the hosts lying in bunk beds, discussing various topics. In some episodes, they are joined by a guest on the "pull-out mattress" - these have included Kathy Burke, Don Warrington, Cate Blanchett, Benjamin Zephaniah, Rhys Ifans, Jane Horrocks, Guy Garvey & Rachael Stirling.

It was described as "slightly weird" by Kate Chisholm, and was praised by Miranda Sawyer as being "strange, funny, silly, enchanting, beautifully put together". The seventh series began its broadcast on 6 January 2021, on BBC Radio 4. The programme was a finalist in the New York Festivals in April 2020. The ninth series began on 12 January 2022, with Harry Shearer a guest in episodes 2 and 3.

Podcasts 
There are over 30 podcasts (created from edited versions of the episodes originally broadcast) which are freely available to stream or download. In addition other episodes from Series 8 and 9 are available to listen again.

External links

Bunk Bed podcasts on BBC Sounds

References

BBC Radio 4 programmes